is a Japanese judoka. She won the bronze medal in the -52 kg weight class at the 2008 Summer Olympics and 2016 Summer Olympics and the gold medal in the same weight class at the 2009 World Judo Championships.

Nakamura began working as a television commentator for judo in 2018.

References

External links
 
 Athlete bio at official Olympics site
 Nakamura Misato facebook fans page

1989 births
Living people
Japanese female judoka
Judoka at the 2008 Summer Olympics
Judoka at the 2012 Summer Olympics
Judoka at the 2016 Summer Olympics
Olympic judoka of Japan
Olympic bronze medalists for Japan
People from Hachiōji, Tokyo
Olympic medalists in judo
Asian Games medalists in judo
Judoka at the 2006 Asian Games
Judoka at the 2010 Asian Games
Medalists at the 2008 Summer Olympics
Medalists at the 2016 Summer Olympics
Judoka at the 2014 Asian Games
Asian Games gold medalists for Japan
Asian Games bronze medalists for Japan
Medalists at the 2006 Asian Games
Medalists at the 2010 Asian Games
Medalists at the 2014 Asian Games
20th-century Japanese women
21st-century Japanese women